Life's Just Great is a 1967 Swedish drama film directed by Jan Halldoff. It was entered into the 17th Berlin International Film Festival.

Cast
 Inger Taube as Britt
 Maj Nielsen as Maj
 Keve Hjelm as Roland
 Bengt Ekerot as The Neighbour
 Lars Hansson as Kent
 Thomas Janson as Thomas
 Stig Törnblom as Jan
 Leif Claesson as Lill-Roland
 Stig Claesson as Writer in Bar
 Lena Hansson as The Sallow Girl
 Lage Lindell as Artist in Bar
 Ove Magnusson as Journalist in Bar
 Mads Rydman as Man Hit by Car
 Hanny Schedin as Grandma

External links

1967 films
1960s Swedish-language films
1967 drama films
Swedish black-and-white films
Films directed by Jan Halldoff
Swedish drama films
1960s Swedish films